The 2020–21 Virginia Cavaliers men's basketball team represented the University of Virginia during the 2020–21 NCAA Division I men's basketball season. The team was led by head coach Tony Bennett in his 12th year and played their home games at John Paul Jones Arena in Charlottesville, Virginia, as members of the Atlantic Coast Conference. In a season limited by the ongoing COVID-19 pandemic, they finished the season 18–7, 13–4 in ACC play to win their fifth regular season championship in eight seasons. They defeated Syracuse in the quarterfinals of the ACC tournament before they were forced to withdraw from the tournament due to COVID-19 issues. They received a bid to the NCAA tournament as the No. 4 seed in the West region. They were upset in the First Round by Ohio.

Previous season 
The Cavaliers finished the 2019–20 season 23–7, 15–5 in ACC play to finish in a three-way tie for second place. The team was scheduled to play Notre Dame in the quarterfinals of the ACC tournament before the tournament was canceled due to the ongoing COVID-19 pandemic.  The NCAA tournament was also later canceled due to the pandemic.

Offseason

Departures

Incoming transfers

2020 recruiting class

Roster

Players

Coaching staff

Depth chart

Schedule and results
Along with Kansas, UCLA, and Georgetown, UVA was supposed to play in the early-season Wooden Legacy in Anaheim, CA, but withdrew due to COVID-19. 

Games that were canceled due to COVID-19 issues include:
 (11/25/20) vs. Maine (Bubbleville)
 (11/27/20) vs. Florida (Bubbleville)
 (12/9/20) Michigan State (ACC-B1G Challenge)
 (12/16/20) at Wake Forest 
 (12/19/20) vs. Villanova (Holiday Hoops Classic)
 (1/2/21) Virginia Tech (Commonwealth Clash)
 (3/12/21) vs. Georgia Tech (ACC tournament)

|-
!colspan=12 style=""| Non-conference regular season

|-
!colspan=12 style=""| ACC Regular Season

|-
!colspan=12 style=""| ACC Tournament

|-
!colspan=12 style=""| NCAA tournament

Source

Rankings

^Coaches did not release a Week 1 poll.

Notes

References

Virginia Cavaliers men's basketball seasons
Virginia
Virginia Cavaliers men's basketball
Virginia Cavaliers men's basketball team
Virginia